Eva Adamczyková, née Samková (born 28 April 1993) is a Czech snowboarder who is the 2014 Olympic champion in snowboard cross. She is also the 2019 and 2023 World Champion in the same discipline.

Career
Samková initially competed in freestyle snowboarding but after several injuries she began competing in snowboard cross in the 2008/2009 season. Her trainers are Marek Jelínek and Jakub Flejšar. Her signature in competitions is a moustache drawn on her upper lip.

Samková won the Junior World Championship three times (2010, 2011, 2013) and the Czech national title in 2013. She also won three races of the World Cup series (Blue Mountain and Montafon 2013, Vallnord-Arcalís 2014). After skipping the 2011/2012 season due to knee injury, she was placed 4th in the FIS Snowboard World Cup series in the 2012/2013 season and in December 2013 she won the Winter Universiade.

Samková took part in the 2014 Winter Olympics in Sochi, where she won the Czech Republic's first gold medal of the games, in snowboard cross. Samková attracted additional comment because she participated in the quarter-final, semi-final and final races with a moustache drawn on her face, which she said was for luck. In the same year Samková placed second at the Winter X Games in Aspen.

At the FIS Freestyle Ski and Snowboarding World Championships 2019, Samková became world champion in Snowboard Cross, defeating Brit Charlotte Bankes in the final. Two years later at the 2021 World Championships, Samková took bronze behind Bankes and Michela Moioli. On 11 December 2021, Samková broke both ankles, when she and Czech compatriot Jan Kubičík took silver in the mixed race during a 2021–22 World Cup event in Montafon, Austria. After fourteen months recovery from injury Adamczyková won in her first past-injury races at the FIS Freestyle Ski and Snowboarding World Championships 2023 and claimed her second world championships gold medal. 

Samková had her own show called Eva tropí hlouposti (Eva Fools Around) named in reference to famous Czech comedy film by Martin Frič.

World Cup results
All results are sourced from the International Ski Federation (FIS).

Season titles
 3 titles – (3 snowboard cross)

Season standings

Race podiums
 18 wins – (18 SBX)
 29 podiums – (29 SBX)

Olympic results

World Championships results

Personal life
On 15 September 2022 Samková married actor Marek Adamczyk.

References

External links

1993 births
Living people
People from Vrchlabí
Czech female snowboarders
Olympic snowboarders of the Czech Republic
Snowboarders at the 2014 Winter Olympics
Snowboarders at the 2018 Winter Olympics
Medalists at the 2014 Winter Olympics
Medalists at the 2018 Winter Olympics
Olympic gold medalists for the Czech Republic
Olympic bronze medalists for the Czech Republic
Olympic medalists in snowboarding
X Games athletes
Universiade medalists in snowboarding
Universiade gold medalists for the Czech Republic
Competitors at the 2013 Winter Universiade
Sportspeople from the Hradec Králové Region